The 1st Asia Pacific Screen Awards were held in  2007. The first award ceremonies saw at least 18 film nominations. The Asia Pacific Screen Awards originated in the city of Brisbane, Australia. It is an international cultural program supported by the Brisbane City Council and powered by Brisbane Marketing. The Asia Pacific Screen Awards is endorsed by Paris-based UNESCO and FIAPF-International Federation of Film Producers Associations.

Nominations

Awards

References

Asia Pacific Screen Awards
Asia Pacific Screen Awards